The Duchy of Pomerania-Stettin, also known as the Duchy of Stettin, and the Duchy of Szczecin, was a feudal duchy in Farther Pomerania within the Holy Roman Empire. Its capital was Szczecin. It was ruled by the Griffin dynasty. It existed in the eras of the High and Late Middle Ages, and the early modern period, between 1160 and 1264, between 1295 and 1523, and between 1532 and 1625.

The state was formed in 1160, in the partition of the Duchy of Pomerania, with duke Bogusław I, as its first ruler. In 1264, Barnim I, Duke of Stettin, had unified duchies of Pomerania-Stettin and Pomerania-Demmin, re-establishing the Duchy of Pomerania. The state was again formed in 1295, in the partition of the Duchy of Pomerania, with Otto I as its ruler. In 1478, the state was incorporated into the re-unified Duchy of Pomerania, under the rule of duke Bogislaw X. Pomerania-Stettin was again established in 21 October 1532, with the partition of Duchy of Pomerania, with Barnim XI as its ruler. The state existed until 1625, when, under the rule of Bogislaw XIV, it was incorporated into the unified Duchy of Pomerania.

List of leaders

First state 
 Bogusław I (1160-1187)
 Bogislaw II and Casimir II (1187-1202)
 Bogislaw II (1202-1220)
 Barnim I (1220-1264)

Second state 
 Otto I (1295-1344)
 Barnim III (1344-1368)
 Casimir III (1368-1372)
 Swantibor I and Bogislaw VII (1372-1404)
 Swantibor I (1404-1413)
 Otto II and Casimir V (1413-1428)
 Casimir V (1428-1435)
 Joachim (1435-1451)
 Otto III (1451-1464)
 Eric II (1464-1474)
 Bogislaw X (1474-1478)

Third state 
 Barnim XI (1531-1569)
 John Frederick (1569-1600)
 Barnim X (1600-1603)
 Bogislaw XIII (1603-1606)
 Philip II (1606-1618)
 Francis (1618-1620)
 Bogislaw XIV (1620-1625)

Citations

Notes

References

Bibliography 
 B. Dopierała, Polskie losy Pomorza Zachodniego
 Jan Maria Piskorski, Pommern im Wandel der Zeiten, Szczecin, Ducal Castle, 1999, ISBN 8390618486.
 E. Rymar, Rodowód książąt pomorskich, Szczecin, Pomeranian Library, 2005, ISBN 83-87879-50-9, OCLC 69296056.
 K. Kozłowski, J. Podralski, Gryfici. Książęta Pomorza Zachodniego, Szczecin, Krajowa Agencja Wydawnicza, 1985, ISBN 83-03-00530-8, OCLC 189424372.
 J. W. Szymański, Książęcy ród Gryfitów, Goleniów–Kielce 2006, ISBN 83-7273-224-8.

 Former countries in Europe
 Former monarchies of Europe
Duchies of the Holy Roman Empire
Stettin
History of Szczecin
 12th-century establishments in Europe
 13th-century disestablishments in Europe
 13th-century establishments in Europe
 16th-century disestablishments in Europe
 16th-century establishments in Europe
 17th-century disestablishments in Europe
 12th century in the Holy Roman Empire
 13th century in the Holy Roman Empire
 14th century in the Holy Roman Empire
 15th century in the Holy Roman Empire
 16th century in the Holy Roman Empire
 17th century in the Holy Roman Empire
 States and territories established in 1160
 States and territories disestablished in 1264
 States and territories established in 1295
 States and territories disestablished in 1523
 States and territories established in 1532
 States and territories disestablished in 1625